Eleanor of Aquitaine ( – 1 April 1204;) was Queen of France from 1137 to 1152 as the wife of King Louis VII, Queen of England from 1154 to 1189 as the wife of King Henry II, and Duchess of Aquitaine in her own right from 1137 until her death in 1204. As the heiress of the House of Poitiers, which controlled much of southwestern France, she was one of the wealthiest and most powerful women in western Europe during the High Middle Ages. She was a patron of poets such as Wace, Benoît de Sainte-Maure, and Bernart de Ventadorn. She was a key leading figure in the Second Crusade.

Eleanor was the daughter of William X, Duke of Aquitaine, and Aénor de Châtellerault. She became duchess upon her father's death in April 1137, and three months later she married Louis, son of her guardian King Louis VI of France. A few weeks later, Eleanor's father-in-law died and her husband succeeded him as King Louis VII. Eleanor and Louis VII had two daughters, Marie and Alix. Soon afterwards, she sought an annulment of her marriage, but her request was rejected by Pope Eugene III. Eventually, Louis agreed to an annulment, as fifteen years of marriage had not produced a son. The marriage was annulled on 21 March 1152 on the grounds of consanguinity within the fourth degree. Their daughters were declared legitimate, custody was awarded to Louis, and Eleanor's lands were restored to her.

As soon as the annulment was granted, Eleanor became engaged to her third cousin Henry, Duke of Normandy. The couple married on Whitsun, 18 May 1152. Henry and Eleanor became king and queen of England in 1154. They had five sons and three daughters. However, Henry and Eleanor eventually became estranged. Henry imprisoned her in 1173 for supporting the revolt of their eldest son, Henry the Young King, against him. She was not released until 6 July 1189, when her husband died and their third son, Richard I, ascended the throne. As queen dowager, Eleanor acted as regent while Richard went on the Third Crusade. She lived well into the reign of her youngest son, John.

Early life
Eleanor's year of birth is not known precisely: a late 13th-century genealogy of her family listing her as 13 years old in the spring of 1137 provides the best evidence that Eleanor was perhaps born as late as 1124. On the other hand, some chronicles mention a fidelity oath of some lords of Aquitaine on the occasion of Eleanor's fourteenth birthday in 1136. This, and her known age of 82 at her death make 1122 the most likely year of her birth. Her parents almost certainly married in 1121. Her birthplace may have been Poitiers, Bordeaux, or Nieul-sur-l'Autise, where her mother and brother died when Eleanor was 6 or 8.

Eleanor (or Aliénor) was the oldest of three children of William X, Duke of Aquitaine, whose glittering ducal court was renowned in early 12th-century Europe, and his wife, Aenor de Châtellerault, the daughter of Aimery I, Viscount of Châtellerault, and Dangereuse de l'Isle Bouchard, who was William IX's longtime mistress as well as Eleanor's maternal grandmother. Her parents' marriage had been arranged by Dangereuse with her paternal grandfather WilliamIX.

Eleanor is said to have been named for her mother Aenor and called Aliénor from the Latin Alia Aenor, which means the other Aenor. It became Eléanor in the langues d'oïl of northern France and Eleanor in English. There was, however, another prominent Eleanor before her—Eleanor of Normandy, an aunt of William the Conqueror, who lived a century earlier than Eleanor of Aquitaine. In Paris as the queen of France, she was called Helienordis, her honorific name as written in the Latin epistles.

By all accounts, Eleanor's father ensured that she had the best possible education. Eleanor came to learn arithmetic, the constellations, and history. She also learned domestic skills such as household management and the needle arts of embroidery, needlepoint, sewing, spinning, and weaving. Eleanor developed skills in conversation, dancing, games such as backgammon, checkers, and chess, playing the harp, and singing. Although her native tongue was Poitevin, she was taught to read and speak Latin, was well versed in music and literature, and schooled in riding, hawking, and hunting. Eleanor was extroverted, lively, intelligent, and strong-willed. Her four-year-old brother William Aigret and their mother died at the castle of Talmont on Aquitaine's Atlantic coast in the spring of 1130. Eleanor became the heir presumptive to her father's domains. The Duchy of Aquitaine was the largest and richest province of France. Poitou, where Eleanor spent most of her childhood, and Aquitaine together was almost one-third the size of modern France. Eleanor had only one other legitimate sibling, a younger sister named Aelith (also called Petronilla). Her half-brother Joscelin was acknowledged by WilliamX as a son, but not as his heir. The notion that she had another half-brother, William, has been discredited. Later, during the first four years of HenryII's reign, her siblings joined Eleanor's royal household.

Inheritance
In 1137 Duke William X left Poitiers for Bordeaux and took his daughters with him. Upon reaching Bordeaux, he left them in the charge of the archbishop of Bordeaux, one of his few loyal vassals. The duke then set out for the Shrine of Saint James of Compostela in the company of other pilgrims. However, he died on Good Friday of that year (9April).

Eleanor, aged 12 to 15, then became the duchess of Aquitaine, and thus the most eligible heiress in Europe. As these were the days when kidnapping an heiress was seen as a viable option for obtaining a title, William dictated a will on the very day he died that bequeathed his domains to Eleanor and appointed King Louis VI of France as her guardian. William requested of the king that he take care of both the lands and the duchess, and find her a suitable husband. However, until a husband was found, the king had the legal right to Eleanor's lands. The duke also insisted to his companions that his death be kept a secret until Louis was informed; the men were to journey from Saint James of Compostela across the Pyrenees as quickly as possible to call at Bordeaux to notify the archbishop, then to make all speed to Paris to inform the king.

The king of France, known as Louis the Fat, was also gravely ill at that time, suffering from a bout of dysentery from which he appeared unlikely to recover. Yet despite his impending death, Louis's mind remained clear. His eldest surviving son, Louis, had originally been destined for monastic life, but had become the heir apparent when the firstborn, Philip, died in a riding accident in 1131.

The death of William, one of the king's most powerful vassals, made available the most desirable duchy in France. While presenting a solemn and dignified face to the grieving Aquitainian messengers, Louis exulted when they departed. Rather than act as guardian to the duchess and duchy, he decided to marry the duchess to his 17-year-old heir and bring Aquitaine under the control of the French crown, thereby greatly increasing the power and prominence of France and its ruling family, the House of Capet. Within hours, the king had arranged for his son Louis to be married to Eleanor, with Abbot Suger in charge of the wedding arrangements. Louis was sent to Bordeaux with an escort of 500 knights, along with Abbot Suger, Theobald II, Count of Champagne, and Raoul I, Count of Vermandois.

First marriage

On 25 July 1137, Eleanor and Louis were married in the Cathedral of Saint-André in Bordeaux by the archbishop of Bordeaux. Immediately after the wedding, the couple were enthroned as duke and duchess of Aquitaine. It was agreed that the duchy would remain independent of France until Eleanor's oldest son became both king of France and duke of Aquitaine. Thus, her holdings would not be merged with France until the next generation. As a wedding present she gave Louis a rock crystal vase {fr}, currently on display at the Louvre. Louis donated the vase to the Basilica of St Denis. This vase is the only object connected with Eleanor of Aquitaine that still survives.

Louis's tenure as count of Poitou and duke of Aquitaine and Gascony lasted only a few days. Although he had been invested as such on 8 August 1137, a messenger gave him the news that Louis VI had died of dysentery on 1 August while he and Eleanor were making a tour of the provinces. He and Eleanor were anointed and crowned king and queen of France on Christmas Day of the same year.

Possessing a high-spirited nature, Eleanor was not popular with the staid northerners; according to sources, Louis's mother Adelaide of Maurienne thought her flighty and a bad influence. She was not aided by memories of Constance of Arles, the Provençal wife of Robert II, tales of whose immodest dress and language were still told with horror. Eleanor's conduct was repeatedly criticised by church elders, particularly Bernard of Clairvaux and Abbot Suger, as indecorous. The king was madly in love with his beautiful and worldly bride, however, and granted her every whim, even though her behaviour baffled and vexed him. Much money went into making the austere Cité Palace in Paris more comfortable for Eleanor's sake.

Conflict
Louis soon came into violent conflict with Pope Innocent II. In 1141, the Archbishopric of Bourges became vacant, and the king put forward as a candidate one of his chancellors, Cadurc, while vetoing the one suitable candidate, Pierre de la Chatre, who was promptly elected by the canons of Bourges and consecrated by the Pope. Louis accordingly bolted the gates of Bourges against the new bishop. The Pope, recalling similar attempts by William X to exile supporters of Innocent from Poitou and replace them with priests loyal to himself, blamed Eleanor, saying that Louis was only a child and should be taught manners. Outraged, Louis swore upon relics that so long as he lived Pierre should never enter Bourges. An interdict was thereupon imposed upon the king's lands, and Pierre was given refuge by Theobald II, Count of Champagne.

Louis became involved in a war with Count Theobald by permitting Raoul I, Count of Vermandois and seneschal of France, to repudiate his wife Eleanor of Blois, Theobald's sister, and to marry Petronilla of Aquitaine, Eleanor's sister. Eleanor urged Louis to support her sister's marriage to Count Raoul. Theobald had also offended Louis by siding with the Pope in the dispute over Bourges. The war lasted two years (1142–44) and ended with the occupation of Champagne by the royal army. Louis was personally involved in the assault and burning of the town of Vitry. More than a thousand people who sought refuge in the church there died in the flames. Horrified, and desiring an end to the war, Louis attempted to make peace with Theobald in exchange for his support in lifting the interdict on Raoul and Petronilla. This was duly lifted for long enough to allow Theobald's lands to be restored; it was then lowered once more when Raoul refused to repudiate Petronilla, prompting Louis to return to Champagne and ravage it once more.

In June 1144, the king and queen visited the newly built monastic church at Saint-Denis. While there, the queen met with Bernard of Clairvaux, asking him to use his influence with the Pope to have the excommunication of Petronilla and Raoul lifted, in exchange for which King Louis would make concessions in Champagne and recognise Pierre de la Chatre as archbishop of Bourges. Dismayed at her attitude, Bernard scolded Eleanor for her lack of penitence and interference in matters of state. In response, Eleanor broke down and meekly excused her behaviour, claiming to be bitter because of her lack of children (her only recorded pregnancy at that time was in about 1138, but she miscarried). In response, Bernard became more kindly towards her: "My child, seek those things which make for peace. Cease to stir up the king against the Church, and urge upon him a better course of action. If you will promise to do this, I in return promise to entreat the merciful Lord to grant you offspring." In a matter of weeks, peace had returned to France: Theobald's provinces were returned and Pierre de la Chatre was installed as archbishop of Bourges. In April 1145, Eleanor gave birth to a daughter, Marie.

Louis, however, still burned with guilt over the massacre at Vitry and wished to make a pilgrimage to the Holy Land to atone for his sins. In autumn 1145, Pope Eugene III requested that Louis lead a Crusade to the Middle East to rescue the Frankish states there from disaster. Accordingly, Louis declared on Christmas Day 1145 at Bourges his intention of going on a crusade.

The Second Crusade
Eleanor of Aquitaine also formally took up the cross symbolic of the Second Crusade during a sermon preached by Bernard of Clairvaux. In addition, she had been corresponding with her uncle Raymond, Prince of Antioch, who was seeking further protection from the French crown against the Saracens. Eleanor recruited some of her royal ladies-in-waiting for the campaign as well as 300 non-noble Aquitainian vassals. She insisted on taking part in the Crusades as the feudal leader of the soldiers from her duchy. She left for the Second Crusade from Vézelay, the rumoured location of Mary Magdalene's grave, in June 1147.

The Crusade itself achieved little. Louis was a weak and ineffectual military leader with no skill for maintaining troop discipline or morale, or of making informed and logical tactical decisions. In eastern Europe, the French army was at times hindered by Manuel I Comnenus, the Byzantine Emperor, who feared that the Crusade would jeopardise the tenuous safety of his empire. Notwithstanding, during their three-week stay at Constantinople, Louis was fêted and Eleanor was much admired. She was compared with Penthesilea, mythical queen of the Amazons, by the Greek historian Nicetas Choniates. He added that she gained the epithet chrysopous (golden-foot) from the cloth of gold that decorated and fringed her robe. Louis and Eleanor stayed in the Philopation palace just outside the city walls.

From the moment the Crusaders entered Asia Minor, things began to go badly. The king and queen were still optimistic—the Byzantine Emperor had told them that King Conrad III of Germany had won a great victory against a Turkish army when in fact the German army had been almost completely destroyed at Dorylaeum. However, while camping near Nicea, the remnants of the German army, including a dazed and sick Conrad III, staggered past the French camp, bringing news of their disaster. The French, with what remained of the Germans, then began to march in increasingly disorganised fashion towards Antioch. They were in high spirits on Christmas Eve, when they chose to camp in a lush valley near Ephesus. Here they were ambushed by a Turkish detachment, but the French proceeded to slaughter this detachment and appropriate their camp.

Louis then decided to cross the Phrygian mountains directly in the hope of reaching Raymond of Poitiers in Antioch more quickly. As they ascended the mountains, however, the army and the king and queen were horrified to discover the unburied corpses of the Germans killed earlier.

On the day set for the crossing of Mount Cadmus, Louis chose to take charge of the rear of the column, where the unarmed pilgrims and the baggage trains marched. The vanguard, with which Queen Eleanor marched, was commanded by her Aquitainian vassal, Geoffrey de Rancon. Unencumbered by baggage, they reached the summit of Cadmus, where Rancon had been ordered to make camp for the night. Rancon, however, chose to continue on, deciding in concert with Amadeus III, Count of Savoy, Louis's uncle, that a nearby plateau would make a better campsite. Such disobedience was reportedly common.

Accordingly, by mid-afternoon, the rear of the column—believing the day's march to be nearly at an end—was dawdling. This resulted in the army becoming separated, with some having already crossed the summit and others still approaching it. In the ensuing Battle of Mount Cadmus, the Turks, who had been following and feinting for many days, seized their opportunity and attacked those who had not yet crossed the summit. The French, both soldiers and pilgrims, taken by surprise, were trapped. Those who tried to escape were caught and killed. Many men, horses, and much of the baggage were cast into the canyon below. The chronicler William of Tyre, writing between 1170 and 1184 and thus perhaps too long after the event to be considered historically accurate, placed the blame for this disaster firmly on the amount of baggage being carried, much of it reputedly belonging to Eleanor and her ladies, and the presence of non-combatants.

The king, having scorned royal apparel in favour of a simple pilgrim's tunic, escaped notice, unlike his bodyguards, whose skulls were brutally smashed and limbs severed. He reportedly "nimbly and bravely scaled a rock by making use of some tree roots which God had provided for his safety" and managed to survive the attack. Others were not so fortunate: "No aid came from Heaven, except that night fell."

Official blame for the disaster was placed on Geoffrey de Rancon, who had made the decision to continue, and it was suggested that he be hanged, a suggestion which the king ignored. Since Geoffrey was Eleanor's vassal, many believed that it was she who had been ultimately responsible for the change in plan, and thus the massacre. This suspicion of responsibility did nothing for her popularity in Christendom. She was also blamed for the size of the baggage train and the fact that her Aquitanian soldiers had marched at the front and thus were not involved in the fight. Continuing on, the army became split, with the commoners marching towards Antioch and the royalty travelling by sea. When most of the land army arrived, the king and queen had a dispute. Some, such as John of Salisbury and William of Tyre, say Eleanor's reputation was sullied by rumours of an affair with her uncle Raymond. However, this rumour may have been a ruse, as Raymond, through Eleanor, had been trying to induce Louis to use his army to attack the actual Muslim encampment at nearby Aleppo, gateway to retaking Edessa, which had all along, by papal decree, been the main objective of the Crusade. Although this was perhaps a better military plan, Louis was not keen to fight in northern Syria. One of Louis's avowed Crusade goals was to journey in pilgrimage to Jerusalem, and he stated his intention to continue. Reputedly Eleanor then requested to stay with Raymond and brought up the matter of consanguinity—the fact that she and her husband, King Louis, were perhaps too closely related. Consanguinity was grounds for annulment in the medieval period. But rather than allowing her to stay, Louis took Eleanor from Antioch against her will and continued on to Jerusalem with his dwindling army.

Louis's refusal and his forcing her to accompany him humiliated Eleanor, and she maintained a low profile for the rest of the crusade. Louis's subsequent siege of Damascus in 1148 with his remaining army, reinforced by Conrad and Baldwin III of Jerusalem, achieved little. Damascus was a major wealthy trading centre and was under normal circumstances a potential threat, but the rulers of Jerusalem had recently entered into a truce with the city, which they then forswore. It was a gamble that did not pay off, and whether through military error or betrayal, the Damascus campaign was a failure. Louis's long march to Jerusalem and back north, which Eleanor was forced to join, debilitated his army and disheartened her knights; the divided Crusade armies could not overcome the Muslim forces, and the royal couple had to return home. The French royal family retreated to Jerusalem and then sailed to Rome and made their way back to Paris.

While in the eastern Mediterranean, Eleanor learned about maritime conventions developing there, which were the beginnings of what would become admiralty law. She introduced those conventions in her own lands on the island of Oléron in 1160 (with the "Rolls of Oléron") and later in England as well. She was also instrumental in developing trade agreements with Constantinople and ports of trade in the Holy Lands.

Annulment
Even before the Crusade, Eleanor and Louis were becoming estranged, and their differences were only exacerbated while they were abroad. Eleanor's purported relationship with her uncle Raymond, the ruler of Antioch, was a major source of discord. Eleanor supported her uncle's desire to re-capture the nearby County of Edessa, the objective of the Crusade. In addition, having been close to him in their youth, she now showed what was considered to be "excessive affection" towards her uncle.

Home, however, was not easily reached. Louis and Eleanor, on separate ships due to their disagreements, were first attacked in May 1149 by Byzantine ships. Although they escaped this attempt unharmed, stormy weather drove Eleanor's ship far to the south to the Barbary Coast and caused her to lose track of her husband. Neither was heard of for over two months. In mid-July, Eleanor's ship finally reached Palermo in Sicily, where she discovered that she and her husband had both been given up for dead. She was given shelter and food by servants of King Roger II of Sicily, until the king eventually reached Calabria, and she set out to meet him there. Later, at King Roger's court in Potenza, she learned of the death of her uncle Raymond, who had been beheaded by Muslim forces in the Holy Land. This news appears to have forced a change of plans, for instead of returning to France from Marseilles, they went to see Pope Eugene III in Tusculum, where he had been driven five months before by a revolt of the Commune of Rome.

Eugene did not, as Eleanor had hoped, grant an annulment. Instead, he attempted to reconcile Eleanor and Louis, confirming the legality of their marriage. He proclaimed that no word could be spoken against it, and that it might not be dissolved under any pretext. He even arranged for Eleanor and Louis to sleep in the same bed. Thus was conceived their second child—not a son, but another daughter, Alix of France.

The marriage was now doomed. Still without a son and in danger of being left with no male heir, as well as facing substantial opposition to Eleanor from many of his barons and her own desire for annulment, Louis bowed to the inevitable. On 11 March 1152, they met at the royal castle of Beaugency to dissolve the marriage. Hugues de Toucy, archbishop of Sens, presided, and Louis and Eleanor were both present, as were the archbishop of Bordeaux and Rouen. Archbishop Samson of Reims acted for Eleanor.

On 21 March, the four archbishops, with the approval of Pope Eugene, granted an annulment on grounds of consanguinity within the fourth degree; Eleanor was Louis' third cousin once removed, and shared common ancestry with Robert II of France. Their two daughters were, however, declared legitimate. Children born to a marriage that was later annulled were not at risk of being "bastardised," because "[w]here parties married in good faith, without knowledge of an impediment, ... children of the marriage were legitimate." [Berman 228.] ) Custody of them was awarded to King Louis. Archbishop Samson received assurances from Louis that Eleanor's lands would be restored to her.

Second marriage

As Eleanor travelled to Poitiers, two lords—Theobald V, Count of Blois, and Geoffrey, Count of Nantes, brother of Henry II, Duke of Normandy—tried to kidnap and marry her to claim her lands. As soon as she arrived in Poitiers, Eleanor sent envoys to Henry, Duke of Normandy and future king of England, asking him to come at once to marry her. On 18 May 1152 (Whit Sunday), eight weeks after her annulment, Eleanor married Henry "without the pomp and ceremony that befitted their rank."

Eleanor was related to Henry even more closely than she had been to Louis: they were cousins to the third degree through their common ancestor Ermengarde of Anjou, wife of Robert I, Duke of Burgundy and Geoffrey, Count of Gâtinais, and they were also descended from King Robert II of France. A marriage between Henry and Eleanor's daughter Marie had earlier been declared impossible due to their status as third cousins once removed. It was rumoured by some that Eleanor had had an affair with Henry's own father, Geoffrey V, Count of Anjou, who had advised his son to avoid any involvement with her.

On 25 October 1154, Henry became king of England. A now heavily pregnant Eleanor, was crowned queen of England by Theobald of Bec, the Archbishop of Canterbury, on 19 December 1154. She may not have been anointed on this occasion, however, because she had already been anointed in 1137. Over the next 13 years, she bore Henry five sons and three daughters: William, Henry, Richard, Geoffrey, John, Matilda, Eleanor, and Joan. Historian John Speed, in his 1611 work History of Great Britain, mentions the possibility that Eleanor had a son named Philip, who died young. His sources no longer exist, and he alone mentions this birth.

Eleanor's marriage to Henry was reputed to be tumultuous and argumentative, although sufficiently cooperative to produce at least eight pregnancies. Henry was by no means faithful to his wife and had a reputation for philandering; he fathered other, illegitimate, children throughout the marriage. Eleanor appears to have taken an ambivalent attitude towards these affairs. Geoffrey of York, for example, was an illegitimate son of Henry, but acknowledged by Henry as his child and raised at Westminster in the care of the queen.

During the period from Henry's accession to the birth of Eleanor's youngest son John, affairs in the kingdom were turbulent: Aquitaine, as was the norm, defied the authority of Henry as Eleanor's husband and answered only to their duchess. Attempts were made to claim Toulouse, the rightful inheritance of Eleanor's grandmother Philippa of Toulouse, but they ended in failure. A bitter feud arose between the king and Thomas Becket, initially his chancellor and closest adviser and later the archbishop of Canterbury. Louis of France had remarried and been widowed; he married for the third time and finally fathered a long-hoped-for son, Philip Augustus, also known as Dieudonné—God-given. "Young Henry", son of Henry and Eleanor, wed Margaret, daughter of Louis from his second marriage. Little is known of Eleanor's involvement in these events. It is certain that by late 1166, Henry's notorious affair with Rosamund Clifford had become known, and Eleanor's marriage to Henry appeared to have become terminally strained.

In 1167, Eleanor's third daughter, Matilda, married Henry the Lion of Saxony. Eleanor remained in England with her daughter for the year prior to Matilda's departure for Normandy in September. In December, Eleanor gathered her movable possessions in England and transported them on several ships to Argentan. Christmas was celebrated at the royal court there, and she appears to have agreed to a separation from Henry. She certainly left for her own city of Poitiers immediately after Christmas. Henry did not stop her; on the contrary, he and his army personally escorted her there before attacking a castle belonging to the rebellious Lusignan family. Henry then went about his own business outside Aquitaine, leaving Earl Patrick, his regional military commander, as her protective custodian. When Patrick was killed in a skirmish, Eleanor, who proceeded to ransom his captured nephew, the young William Marshal, was left in control of her lands.

The Court of Love in Poitiers

Of all her influence on culture, Eleanor's time in Poitiers between 1168 and 1173 was perhaps the most critical, yet very little is known about it. Henry II was elsewhere, attending to his own affairs after escorting Eleanor there. Some believe that Eleanor's court in Poitiers was the "Court of Love" where Eleanor and her daughter Marie meshed and encouraged the ideas of troubadours, chivalry, and courtly love into a single court. It may have been largely to teach manners, something the French courts would be known for in later generations. Yet the existence and reasons for this court are debated.

In The Art of Courtly Love, Andreas Capellanus, Andrew the chaplain, refers to the court of Poitiers. He claims that Eleanor, her daughter Marie, Ermengarde, Viscountess of Narbonne, and Isabelle of Flanders would sit and listen to the quarrels of lovers and act as a jury to the questions of the court that revolved around acts of romantic love. He records some twenty-one cases, the most famous of them being a problem posed to the women about whether true love can exist in marriage. According to Capellanus, the women decided that it was not at all likely.

Some scholars believe that the "court of love" probably never existed since the only evidence for it is Andreas Capellanus' book. To strengthen their argument, they state that there is no other evidence that Marie ever stayed with her mother in Poitiers. Andreas wrote for the court of the king of France, where Eleanor was not held in esteem. Polly Schroyer Brooks, the author of a non-academic biography of Eleanor, suggests that the court did exist, but that it was not taken very seriously, and that acts of courtly love were just a "parlour game" made up by Eleanor and Marie in order to place some order over the young courtiers living there.

There is no claim that Eleanor invented courtly love, for it was a concept that had begun to grow before Eleanor's court arose. All that can be said is that her court at Poitiers was most likely a catalyst for the increased popularity of courtly love literature in the Western European regions. Amy Kelly, in her article, "Eleanor of Aquitaine and Her Courts of Love," gives a very plausible description of the origins of the rules of Eleanor's court: "In the Poitevin code, man is the property, the very thing of woman; whereas a precisely contrary state of things existed in the adjacent realms of the two kings from whom the reigning duchess of Aquitaine was estranged."

Revolt and capture
In March 1173, aggrieved at his lack of power and egged on by Henry's enemies, his son by the same name, the younger Henry, launched the Revolt of 1173–1174. He fled to Paris. From there, "the younger Henry, devising evil against his father from every side by the advice of the French king, went secretly into Aquitaine where his two youthful brothers, Richard and Geoffrey, were living with their mother, and with her connivance, so it is said, he incited them to join him." One source claimed that the queen sent her younger sons to France "to join with him against their father the king." Once her sons had left for Paris, Eleanor may have encouraged the lords of the south to rise up and support them.

Sometime between the end of March and the beginning of May, Eleanor left Poitiers, but was arrested and sent to the king at Rouen. The king did not announce the arrest publicly; for the next year, the queen's whereabouts were unknown. On 8 July 1174, Henry and Eleanor took ship for England from Barfleur. As soon as they disembarked at Southampton, Eleanor was taken either to Winchester Castle or Sarum Castle and held there.

Years of imprisonment 1173–1189
Eleanor was imprisoned for the next 16 years, much of the time in various locations in England. During her imprisonment, Eleanor became more and more distant from her sons, especially from Richard, who had always been her favourite. She did not have the opportunity to see her sons very often during her imprisonment, though she was released for special occasions such as Christmas. About four miles from Shrewsbury and close by Haughmond Abbey is "Queen Eleanor's Bower", the remains of a possible triangular timber castle which is believed to have been one of her prisons.

Henry lost the woman reputed to be his great love, Rosamund Clifford, in 1176. He had met her in 1166 and had begun their liaison in 1173, supposedly contemplating divorce from Eleanor. This notorious affair caused a monkish scribe to transcribe Rosamund's name in Latin to "Rosa Immundi", or "Rose of Unchastity". The king had many mistresses, but although he treated earlier liaisons discreetly, he flaunted Rosamund. He may have done so to provoke Eleanor into seeking an annulment, but if so, the queen disappointed him. Nevertheless, rumours persisted, perhaps assisted by Henry's camp, that Eleanor had poisoned Rosamund. It is also speculated that Eleanor placed Rosamund in a bathtub and had an old woman cut Rosamund's arms. Henry donated much money to Godstow Nunnery in Oxfordshire, where Rosamund was buried.

In 1183, the young King Henry tried again to force his father to hand over some of his patrimony. In debt and refused control of Normandy, he tried to ambush his father at Limoges. He was joined by troops sent by his brother Geoffrey and Philip II of France. Henry II's troops besieged the town, forcing his son to flee. After wandering aimlessly through Aquitaine, Henry the Younger caught dysentery. On Saturday, 11 June 1183, the young king realized he was dying and was overcome with remorse for his sins. When his father's ring was sent to him, he begged that his father would show mercy to his mother, and that all his companions would plead with Henry to set her free. Henry II sent Thomas of Earley, Archdeacon of Wells, to break the news to Eleanor at Sarum. Eleanor reputedly had a dream in which she foresaw her son Henry's death. In 1193, she would tell Pope Celestine III that she was tortured by his memory.

King Philip II of France claimed that certain properties in Normandy belonged to his half-sister Margaret, widow of the young Henry, but Henry insisted that they had once belonged to Eleanor and would revert to her upon her son's death. For this reason Henry summoned Eleanor to Normandy in the late summer of 1183. She stayed in Normandy for six months. This was the beginning of a period of greater freedom for the still-supervised Eleanor. Eleanor went back to England probably early in 1184. Over the next few years Eleanor often travelled with her husband and was sometimes associated with him in the government of the realm, but still had a custodian so that she was not free.

Widowhood
Upon the death of her husband Henry II on 6 July 1189, Richard I was the undisputed heir. One of his first acts as king was to send William Marshal to England with orders to release Eleanor from prison; he found upon his arrival that her custodians had already released her. Eleanor rode to Westminster and received the oaths of fealty from many lords and prelates on behalf of the king. She ruled England in Richard's name, signing herself "Eleanor, by the grace of God, Queen of England". On 13August 1189, Richard sailed from Barfleur to Portsmouth and was received with enthusiasm. Between 1190 and 1194, Richard was absent from England, engaged in the Third Crusade from 1190 to 1192, and then held in captivity by Henry VI, Holy Roman Emperor. During Richard's absence, royal authority in England was represented by a Council of Regency in conjunction with a succession of chief justiciars—William de Longchamp (1190–1191), Walter deCoutances (1191–1193), and Hubert Walter. Although Eleanor held no formal office in England during this period, she arrived in England in the company of Coutances in June 1191, and for the remainder of Richard's absence, she exercised a considerable degree of influence over the affairs of England as well as the conduct of Prince John. Eleanor played a key role in raising the ransom demanded from England by HenryVI and in the negotiations with the Holy Roman Emperor that eventually secured Richard's release. Evidence of the influence she wielded can also be found within the numerous letters she wrote to Pope Celestine III regarding Richard's captivity. Her letter dated 1193, presents her strong expressions of personal suffering as a result of Richard's captivity and informs the Pope that in her grief she is "wasted away by sorrow".

Eleanor survived Richard and lived well into the reign of her youngest son, King John. In 1199, under the terms of a truce between King PhilipII and King John, it was agreed that Philip's 12-year-old heir-apparent Louis would be married to one of John's nieces, daughters of his sister Eleanor of England, queen of Castile. John instructed his mother to travel to Castile to select one of the princesses. Now 77, Eleanor set out from Poitiers. Just outside Poitiers she was ambushed and held captive by Hugh IX of Lusignan, whose lands had been sold to HenryII by his forebears. Eleanor secured her freedom by agreeing to his demands. She continued south, crossed the Pyrenees, and travelled through the kingdoms of Navarre and Castile, arriving in Castile before the end of January 1200.

Eleanor's daughter, Queen Eleanor of Castile, had two remaining unmarried daughters, Urraca and Blanche. Eleanor selected the younger daughter, Blanche. She stayed for two months at the Castilian court, then late in March journeyed with granddaughter Blanche back across the Pyrenees. She celebrated Easter in Bordeaux, where the famous warrior Mercadier came to her court. It was decided that he would escort the queen and princess north. "On the second day in Easter week, he was slain in the city by a man-at-arms in the service of Brandin", a rival mercenary captain. This tragedy was too much for the elderly queen, who was fatigued and unable to continue to Normandy. She and Blanche rode in easy stages to the valley of the Loire, and she entrusted Blanche to the archbishop of Bordeaux, who took over as her escort. The exhausted Eleanor went to Fontevraud, where she remained. In early summer, Eleanor was ill, and John visited her at Fontevraud.

Eleanor was again unwell in early 1201. When war broke out between John and Philip, Eleanor declared her support for John and set out from Fontevraud to her capital Poitiers to prevent her grandson Arthur I, Duke of Brittany, posthumous son of Eleanor's son Geoffrey and John's rival for the English throne, from taking control. Arthur learned of her whereabouts and besieged her in the castle of Mirebeau. As soon as John heard of this, he marched south, overcame the besiegers, and captured the 15-year-old Arthur, and probably his sister Eleanor, Fair Maid of Brittany, whom Eleanor had raised with Richard. Eleanor then returned to Fontevraud where she took the veil as a nun.

Eleanor died in 1204 and was entombed in Fontevraud Abbey next to her husband Henry and her son Richard. Her tomb effigy shows her reading a Bible and is decorated with representations of magnificent jewellery; such effigies were rare, and Eleanor's is one of the finest of the few that survive from this period. However, during the French Revolution the abbey of Fontevraud was sacked and the tombs were disturbed and vandalised – consequently the bones of Eleanor, Henry, Richard, Joanna and Isabella of Angoulême were exhumed and scattered, never to be recovered. By the time of her death she had outlived all of her children except for King John of England and Queen Eleanor of Castile.

Appearance

Contemporary sources praise Eleanor's beauty. Even in an era when ladies of the nobility were excessively praised, their praise of her was undoubtedly sincere. When she was young, she was described as perpulchra—more than beautiful. When she was around 30, Bernard de Ventadour, a noted troubadour, called her "gracious, lovely, the embodiment of charm", extolling her "lovely eyes and noble countenance" and declaring that she was "one meet to crown the state of any king". William of Newburgh emphasised the charms of her person, and even in her old age Richard of Devizes described her as beautiful, while Matthew Paris, writing in the 13thcentury, recalled her "admirable beauty".

In spite of all these words of praise, no one left a more detailed description of Eleanor; the colour of her hair and eyes, for example, are unknown. The effigy on her tomb shows a tall and large-boned woman with brown skin, though this may not be an accurate representation. Her seal of  shows a woman with a slender figure, but this is probably an impersonal image.

Popular culture

Art
Judy Chicago's artistic installation The Dinner Party features a place setting for Eleanor, and she was portrayed by Frederick Sandys in his 1858 painting, Queen Eleanor.

Books and dramas
Henry and Eleanor are the main characters in James Goldman's 1966 play The Lion in Winter, which was made into a film in 1968 starring Peter O'Toole as Henry and Katharine Hepburn in the role of Eleanor, for which she won the Academy Award for Best Actress and the BAFTA Award for Best Actress in a Leading Role and was nominated for the Golden Globe Award for Best Actress – Motion Picture Drama.

Jean Plaidy's novel The Courts of Love, fifth in the 'Queens of England' series, is a fictionalised autobiography of Eleanor of Aquitaine.

Norah Lofts wrote a fictionalized biography of her, entitled in various editions Queen in Waiting or Eleanor the Queen, and including some romanticized episodes—starting off with the young Eleanor planning to elope with a young knight, who is killed out of hand by her guardian, in order to facilitate her marriage to the King's son.

The character Queen Elinor appears in William Shakespeare's The Life and Death of King John, with other members of the family. On television, she has been portrayed in this play by Una Venning in the BBC Sunday Night Theatre version (1952) and by Mary Morris in the BBC Shakespeare version (1984).

Eleanor features in the novel Via Crucis (1899) by F. Marion Crawford.

Eleanor serves as an important allegorical figure in Ezra Pound's early Cantos.

In Sharon Kay Penman's Plantagenet novels, she figures prominently in When Christ and His Saints Slept, Time and Chance, and Devil's Brood, and also appears in Lionheart and A King's Ransom, both of which focus on the reign of her son, Richard, as king of England. Eleanor also appears briefly in the first novel of Penman's Welsh trilogy, Here Be Dragons. In Penman's historical mysteries, Eleanor, as Richard's regent, sends squire Justin de Quincy on various missions, often an investigation of a situation involving Prince John. The four published mysteries are the Queen's Man, Cruel as the Grave, Dragon's Lair, and Prince of Darkness.

Eleanor is the subject of A Proud Taste for Scarlet and Miniver, a children's novel by E. L. Konigsburg.

Historical fiction author Elizabeth Chadwick wrote a three-volume series about Eleanor: The Summer Queen (2013), The Winter Crown (2014) and The Autumn Throne (2016).

Historical fiction author Ariana Franklin features Eleanor prominently in her novel The Serpent's Tale (2008) and the queen appears again as a character in subsequent novel A Murderous Procession (2010).

In The Merry Adventures of Robin Hood, Howard Pyle, retelling the ballad Robin Hood and Queen Katherine, made the queen Queen Eleanor to fit historically with the rest of the work.

She has also been introduced in The Royal Diaries series in the book Crown Jewel of Aquitaine by Kristiana Gregory.

She is a supporting character in Matrix by Lauren Groff.

Film, radio and television

Eleanor has featured in a number of screen versions of the Ivanhoe and Robin Hood stories. She has been played by Martita Hunt in The Story of Robin Hood and His Merrie Men (1952), Jill Esmond in the British TV adventure series The Adventures of Robin Hood (1955–1960), Phyllis Neilson-Terry in the British TV adventure series Ivanhoe (1958), Yvonne Mitchell in the BBC TV drama series The Legend of Robin Hood (1975), Siân Phillips in the TV series Ivanhoe (1997), and Tusse Silberg in the TV series The New Adventures of Robin Hood (1997). She was portrayed by Lynda Bellingham in the BBC series Robin Hood. Most recently, she was portrayed by Eileen Atkins in Robin Hood (2010).

In the 1964 film Becket, Eleanor is briefly played by Pamela Brown to Peter O'Toole's first performance as a young Henry II.

In the 1968 film The Lion in Winter, Eleanor is played by Katharine Hepburn, who won the third of her four Academy Awards for Best Actress for her portrayal, and Henry again is portrayed by O'Toole. The film is about the difficult relationship between them and the struggle of their three sons Richard, Geoffrey, and John for their father's favour and the succession. In the 2003 television film version, Eleanor was played by Glenn Close alongside Patrick Stewart as Henry.

She was portrayed by Mary Clare in the silent film Becket (1923), by Prudence Hyman in Richard the Lionheart (1962), and twice by Jane Lapotaire in the BBC TV drama series The Devil's Crown (1978) and again in Mike Walker's BBC Radio 4 series Plantagenet (2010). In the 2014 film Richard the Lionheart: Rebellion, Eleanor is played by Debbie Rochon.

Her life was portrayed on BBC Radio 4 in the drama series Eleanor Rising, with Rose Basista as Eleanor and Joel MacCormack as King Louis. The first series of five 15-minute episodes was broadcast in November 2020, a second series in April 2021, and a third series of two 60 minute episodes in September 2022.

Music
Eleanor and Rosamund Clifford, as well as Henry IIand Rosamund's father, appear in Gaetano Donizetti's opera Rosmonda d'Inghilterra (libretto by Felice Romani), which was premiered in Florence, at the Teatro Pergola, in 1834.

Eleanor of Aquitaine is thought to be the queen of England mentioned in the poem "Were diu werlt alle min," used as the tenth movement of Carl Orff's famous cantata, Carmina Burana.

Flower and Hawk is a monodrama for soprano and orchestra, written by American composer, Carlisle Floyd that premiered in 1972, in which the soprano (Eleanor of Aquitaine) relives past memories of her time as queen, and at the end of the monodrama, hears the bells that toll for Henry II's death, and in turn, her freedom.

Queen Elanor's Confession, or Queen Eleanor's Confession, is Child ballad 156. Although the figures are intended as Eleanor of Aquitaine, Henry II of England, and William Marshall, the story is an entire invention.

Video games
In the 2019 video game expansion Civilization VI: Gathering Storm, Eleanor is a playable leader for the English and French civilizations.

Issue

See also
 Grandmother of Europe, sobriquet of Eleanor of Aquitaine and others
 List of longest-reigning monarchs

Notes

Explanatory notes

Citations

General and cited references 

 
 
  (for young readers)
 
 
 
 
 
 
 
 
 
 ; 
 ; 
 
 
 
 
 ;

Further reading
 
 
 
 
 
 
 ;

External links

 Eleanor of Aquitaine at BBC History
 The Eleanor Vase preserved at the Louvre
 RoyaList Online interactive family tree (en)

|-

|-

|-

|-

1122 births
1204 deaths
12th-century English people
12th-century English women
12th-century French people
12th-century French women
12th-century viceregal rulers
12th-century women rulers
13th-century English people
13th-century English women
13th-century French people
13th-century French women
13th-century women rulers
Burials at Fontevraud Abbey
Christians of the Second Crusade
Countesses of Anjou
Countesses of Maine
Counts of Poitiers
Duchesses of Aquitaine
Duchesses of Normandy
Dukes of Gascony
English royal consorts
French patrons of literature
French queens consort
Henry II of England
House of Poitiers
People from Aquitaine
Queen mothers
Regents of England
Remarried royal consorts
Robin Hood characters
Women in 12th-century warfare
Women in medieval European warfare
Women in war in the Middle East
Women who experienced pregnancy loss